The Nerskaya is a river in Moscow Oblast, Russia. It is a left tributary of the Moskva. It is 92 km in length, with a drainage basin of 1,510 km². Its average discharge is 8.3 m³/s.

The town of Kurovskoye is on the Nerskaya.

Ponor, Volnaya, Guslitsa, Sechenka and Sushenka are tributaries of the Nerskaya.

References

Rivers of Moscow Oblast